Giuliana Marion Olmos Dick (born 4 March 1993) is a Mexican professional tennis player.
Olmos, who graduated from the University of Southern California in 2016, has a career-high singles ranking of world No. 343 by the Women's Tennis Association (WTA), reached on 4 March 2019, and a career-high doubles ranking of No. 7, achieved on 26 September 2022. She has won five doubles titles on the WTA Tour, as well as four singles and 11 doubles titles on the ITF Circuit. With her partner Desirae Krawczyk, she became the first Mexican player in the Open Era to reach a WTA Tour final at the 2018 Monterrey Open. In 2019, she became the first Mexican player to win a WTA Tour title, taking the doubles crown at the Nottingham Open. In 2020, she became the first Mexican woman to win the Mexican Open, also with Krawczyk. In 2022, she became the first Mexican woman to enter the iop 10 in the WTA rankings in either singles or doubles.

Early life
Olmos is the daughter of a Mexican man and a Mexican-Austrian woman, who was born in the Austrian city of Schwarzach im Pongau, and moved to Fremont, California at the age of two. Along with her two younger sisters she was taken to events attended by Mexican sportswomen, like golfer Lorena Ochoa and tennis player Melissa Torres Sandoval. Olmos started playing tennis at the age of four, and decided she wanted to be a professional player at eleven. Holding citizenship for three countries, she played for the United States in junior and ITF tournaments and ranked second among American players until the age of 16, when she accepted an offer to represent Mexico, who would sponsor her, pay for travel expenses and give her a spot in the Junior Fed Cup and Fed Cup teams. While attending the University of Southern California, majoring in international relations and minoring in occupational therapy, Olmos took part in two editions of the Summer Universiade, in 2013 and 2015.

Professional career

2018-20: Breakthrough
After graduating from the USC, where she learned that was a better doubles player, Olmos became the first Mexican player in the Open Era to reach a WTA final, the 
2018 Monterrey Open partnering Desirae Krawczyk. One year later, also alongside Krawczyk, Olmos was the first Mexican champion of a WTA tournament in the 2019 Nottingham Open.

2021: Grand Slam quarterfinal & mixed doubles final, WTA 1000 title, Olympics & top 25 debuts
In February, Olmos and Canadian player Sharon Fichman reached their first Grand Slam quarterfinal at the Australian Open, and in April she partnered with another Canadian, Gabriela Dabrowski, to reach the semifinals of another WTA-1000 tournament at the Miami Open.

In May, Olmos won the biggest title in her tennis career at the WTA 1000 Italian Open, partnering with Fichman; in the final, they defeated the pair of Kristina Mladenović and Markéta Vondroušová who were making their debut playing together. They entered the tournament as alternates and defeated top seeds Hsieh/Mertens and the Japanese fourth-seeded duo Aoyama/Shibahara en route to the championship match. As a result, she entered the top 30 in doubles for the first time in her career.

Also in 2021, Olmos qualified for the 2020 Tokyo Olympics, partnering Renata Zarazúa, both making their Olympics debut, and being the first Mexican women to play Olympic tennis since Angélica Gavaldón in 1996.

At the US Open, Olmos partnered Marcelo Arévalo in the mixed doubles draw and reached the final by defeating top seeds Nicole Melichar-Martinez and Ivan Dodig en route. They lost to second-seeded pair, Desirae Krawczyk and Joe Salisbury, in straight sets. Olmos became the first Mexican to reach a major final since Santiago González made the men's doubles final (with American Donald Young) at Roland Garros in 2017. Olmos and Fichman ended up playing the 2022 WTA Finals in front of her home crowd in Guadalajara.

2022: New partnership & first WTA 1000 title with Dabrowski, historic world No. 7
Olmos started to play the 2022 season with Dabrowski, with whom she had played the 2021 Miami Open. Seeded second, they went on to win their first Masters tournament together at the Madrid Open. As a result, she reached a new career-high doubles ranking of world No. 11, on 9 May 2022. Olmos and Dabrowski followed that by also reaching the final of the Italian Open.

She made the top 10 on 12 September 2022 at world No. 8, after reaching the quarterfinals at the US Open with Dabrowski, becoming the first ever Mexican woman to be ranked inside the WTA top 10 in either singles or doubles.
At the Pan Pacific Open, she won her second team title with Dabrowski, without losing a single set. Following this run, she achieved a new career-high of world No. 7, on 26 September 2022, and qualified for the 2022 WTA Finals with Dabrowski in their first appearance as a team.

Fed Cup
Olmos has represented Mexico in Fed Cup. She has a win–loss record of 16–14, and in 2022, she was selected as captain for the 2022 Billie Jean King Cup Americas Zone.

Performance timeline

Only main-draw results in WTA Tour, Grand Slam tournaments, Fed Cup/Billie Jean King Cup and Olympic Games are included in win–loss records.

Doubles
Current after the 2023 Australian Open.

Mixed doubles

Grand Slam finals

Mixed doubles: 1 (runner-up)

Other significant finals

WTA 1000 finals

Doubles: 3 (2 titles, 1 runner-up)

WTA career finals

Doubles: 11 (5 titles, 6 runner-ups)

WTA Challenger finals

Doubles: 1 (runner-up)

ITF Circuit finals

Singles: 5 (4 titles, 1 runner–up)

Doubles: 21 (11 titles, 10 runner–ups)

Notes

References

External links
 
 
 
 University of Southern California profile

1993 births
Living people
Mexican female tennis players
People from St. Johann im Pongau District
USC Trojans women's tennis players
People from Fremont, California
Competitors at the 2013 Summer Universiade
Competitors at the 2015 Summer Universiade
Competitors at the 2018 Central American and Caribbean Games
Central American and Caribbean Games gold medalists for Mexico
Central American and Caribbean Games silver medalists for Mexico
Central American and Caribbean Games bronze medalists for Mexico
Mexican people of Austrian descent
Tennis players at the 2019 Pan American Games
Central American and Caribbean Games medalists in tennis
Pan American Games competitors for Mexico
Olympic tennis players of Mexico
Tennis players at the 2020 Summer Olympics
21st-century Mexican women